John M. Maddison FSA (born 1952) is a Scottish architectural historian and artist. He was architectural adviser to the Victorian Society and then historic buildings representative to the National Trust in East Anglia. He is a fellow of the Society of Antiquaries of London. He is a former chair of the governors of Norwich School of Art and Design and trustee of the Cambridgeshire Historic Churches Trust. He designed a new altarpiece in eight panels for Bishop Alcock's Chapel at Ely Cathedral.

Selected publications
 Blickling Hall. National Trust, 1987. 
 Medieval archaeology and architecture at Lichfield. British Archaeological Association, 1993. (Editor) 
 Felbrigg Hall. National Trust, 1995. 
 Ely Cathedral design and meaning. Ely Cathedral Publications, Ely, 2000.

References

External links 
http://www.johnmaddison.co.uk

Living people
British architectural historians
Fellows of the Society of Antiquaries of London
Scottish artists
Scottish architecture writers
1952 births
Writers from St Andrews
Alumni of the University of Manchester
Ely Cathedral
20th-century Scottish historians